Farmi Suomi 2020 (The Farm Finland 2020) is the first season of the Finnish version of The Farm reality television show and the first version of The Farm to air in Finland since 2014. 12 celebrities come to The Farm and compete in challenges to try and live as it was 100 years prior while also trying to be the last farmer standing. The Farm this year is located in Pieksämäki within the South Savo region. The season premiered on 19 March 2020 and concluded on 21 May 2020 when Ice Hockey Goaltender, Noora Räty won the final duel against Youtuber, Jaakko Parkkali to win €30,000 and become the winner of The Farm.

Finishing order
(age are stated at time of competition)

The game

Notes

References

External links

The Farm (franchise)
Finnish reality television series